The R723 is a Regional Route in Free State, South Africa that connects Parys with Heilbron.

Route
Its north-western terminus is the R59 at Parys. From there it runs south-east, crossing the N1. It then meets the R82, and becomes cosigned with it briefly, heading east. Diverging from the R82, it continues south-east to end its route at Heilbron at an intersection with the R57.

References 

Regional Routes in the Free State (province)